Soso may refer to:

 Boris Michel Soso (1917-2002), American actor and film producer better known as Brad Dexter
 Soso, Mississippi, town in the United States
 Soso (search engine) (搜搜) a Chinese search engine site owned by Tencent Holdings Limited
 Soso, a childhood nickname of Joseph Stalin (1878 - 1953)
 Julie Soso (born 1960), Papua New Guinean politician
 Brook Soso, fictional character in Orange Is the New Black
 Soso (born Wang Chingyi, 2001), Taiwanese singer and member of South Korean girl group GWSN
 Soso, nickname of Sophia Somajo (born 1985), Swedish musician
 Soso people of West Africa